The Borneo Convention Centre Kuching (BCCK) is a convention centre located in Kuching, Sarawak, Malaysia. It is the first dedicated convention and exhibition centre in Borneo and the second-largest convention centre in Borneo after the Sabah International Convention Centre in Kota Kinabalu. Located approximately 8 km from the city centre, it aims to organize and attract local and international concerts, events, exhibitions and conventions to Sarawak.

The convention centre is managed by Borneo Isthmus Development Sdn. Bhd., which is a Sarawak state-owned company. It oversees all operational aspects of convention centre. BCCK is commonly mistaken as the new office for the Sarawak Convention Bureau (SCB). The SCB functions to attract and bid for conferences and meetings to the state of Sarawak which can be hosted in any venue as chosen by the organizers.

Construction
Located on a six-hectare riverfront site in the city of Kuching, construction began in June 2006. The estimated cost of construction was about RM 200 million. Construction was completed in October 2009.

Architecture
A major element in the design – when viewed from the outside – is its roof structure. The centre's roof is shaped in the form of a “ririk” leaf, which in the Iban language refers to the species Phacelophrynium maximum. "Ririk" grows in abundance in Sarawak, and due to its large leaves, it is used by many indigenous tribes for wrapping rice and food.

The roof canopy is supported by a series of exposed structural elements resembling the trunks and branches of rainforest trees. BCCK is designed on an east–west axis to mitigate the effects of solar gain. It is also oriented to face Mecca and incorporates a Muslim prayer room.

Specifications
The building has a gross floor area of 36,500 square metres and the internal design offers complete flexibility with functional spaces able to be sub-divided into a variety of sizes and configurations for plenary sessions, exhibitions and banquets.

The capacities in BCCK include 1,500 delegates in plenary, a 2,000-capacity banquet hall and 14 breakout meetings rooms. The largest pillar free exhibition space is 2,500 square meters. Car parking for 800 vehicles is provided in a combination of underground and open parking.

In addition, BCCK provides supporting service areas including reception and pre-function assembly areas, a VIP lounge, administration offices, commercial kitchens capable of servicing 2,000 delegates and a public restaurant.

Facilities
 Meeting Room
 Conference Room
 Exhibition Hall

Major events in BCCK
 TEDxYouth @ Kenyalang 2016
 TEDxKenyalang 2017
 13th World Islamic Economic Forum (WIEF) (2017)
 20th Gempuru Besai Iban 2017
 Miss World Malaysia 2018
 23rd Asian Television Awards 2019

Awards

References 

2009 establishments in Malaysia
Buildings and structures in Kuching
Convention centres in Malaysia
Tourist attractions in Kuching